Amor Enterrado (English: "Buried Love") is a song by American singer Romeo Santos with Dominican singer Joe Veras. It is the eighth single for Santos' fourth studio album Utopía (2019). The music video was released on August 22, 2019. It was directed and produced by Fernando Lugo.

Charts

References 

2019 singles
2019 songs
Bachata songs
Romeo Santos songs
Spanish-language songs
Sony Music Latin singles
Songs written by Romeo Santos
Male vocal duets